Lars Gustaf Oscar Lantz (born 1981) is a Swedish politician and member of the Riksdag, the national legislature. A member of the Social Democratic Party, he has represented Uppsala County since September 2022.  He had previously been a substitute member of the Riksdag for Ardalan Shekarabi three times: April 2017 to December 2017; September 2018 to August 2020; and December 2020 to September 2022.

References

1981 births
Living people
Members of the Riksdag 2022–2026
Members of the Riksdag from the Social Democrats